Rolf van Rijn (born 23 October 1972) is a Dutch retired basketball player. Van Rijn, 2.17 m (7 ft 1 in) tall, played as center for several teams over his career. In 1998, he was a member of Real Madrid. He also played for the Netherlands national basketball team.

References

1972 births
Dutch men's basketball players
Dutch expatriate basketball people in Spain
Butler Bulldogs men's basketball players
Feyenoord Basketball players
Real Madrid Baloncesto players
Dutch Basketball League players
Liga ACB players
BCM Gravelines players
Spirou Charleroi players
Belfius Mons-Hainaut players
Living people
Centers (basketball)